Dipsochares is a monotypic snout moth genus. Its single species, Dipsochares nephelopa, is known from the Democratic Republic of the Congo. Both the genus and species were first described by Edward Meyrick in 1937.

References

Phycitinae
Monotypic moth genera
Moths of Africa